Henri Charles Gladyson (born 26 April 1989) is a Malagasy international footballer who plays for Sainte-Marienne as a forward.

Career
He has played club football for CNaPS Sport, St Michel United and Sainte-Marienne.

He made his international debut for Madagascar in 2014.

References

1989 births
Living people
Malagasy footballers
Madagascar international footballers
CNaPS Sport players
St Michel United FC players
US Sainte-Marienne players
Association football forwards
Malagasy expatriate footballers
Malagasy expatriate sportspeople in Seychelles
Expatriate footballers in Seychelles
Malagasy expatriate sportspeople in Réunion
Expatriate footballers in Réunion